Vanadium chloride may refer to:

Vanadium(II) chloride, VCl2
Vanadium(III) chloride, VCl3
Vanadium(IV) chloride, VCl4
Vanadium(V) chloride, VCl5